Harreld is a surname. Notable people with the surname include:

Bruce Harreld (born 1950), American businessman and academic administrator
Donald J. Harreld, American historian
John W. Harreld (1872-1950), American politician
Kemper Harreld (1885–1971), American violinist

See also
Harrold (surname)